The team dressage event at the 2020 Summer Olympics is scheduled to take place from 24 to 27 July 2021 at the Baji Koen. Like all other equestrian events, the dressage competition is open-gender, with both male and female athletes competing in the same division. 45 riders (15 teams of 3) from 15 nations are expected to compete.

Background

This will be the 21st appearance of the event. Unlike the rest of the current equestrian programme—five events which have been held continuously since 1912 (with one, individual jumping, also held in 1900)—there was no team dressage event in 1912, 1920, 1924, or 1960.

The two-time and reigning Olympic champions are Sönke Rothenberger, Dorothee Schneider, Kristina Bröring-Sprehe, and Isabell Werth of Germany; Germany has won 6 of the 7 times the event has been held since reunification of the nation (taking silver in the other, 2012), West Germany had won 4 of the 6 between the separation of East and West for Olympic purposes and reunification (boycotting 1980 and taking silver in 1972), and the United Team of Germany winning in 1964. The reigning (2018) World Champion is also Germany, with Rothenberger and Werth on the team along with Jessica von Bredow-Werndl and Dorothee Schneider. Rothenberger, Schneider, and Werth have been named as the Olympic team.

An Olympics.com preview of equestrian (all events) provided the following overview:

Qualification

A National Olympic Committee (NOC) could enter a team of 3 riders in the team dressage. Quota places are allocated to the NOC, which selects the riders. There were 15 team quota places available, allocated as follows:

 Host nation: Japan was guaranteed a team
 World Games: The top 6 teams at the 2018 FEI World Equestrian Games, excluding Japan
 European Championships: The top 3 teams from the 2019 FEI European Championships, in geographic groups A and B (Northwest and Southwest Europe)
 Group C event: The top team from a group C (Central Europe, Eastern Europe, and Central Asia) qualification event
 Pan American Games: The top 2 teams from the 2019 Pan-American Games, with groups D and E covering North, Central, and South America
 Group F event: The top team from a group F (Africa, Middle East) qualification event
 Group G at the World Games: The top team from group G (Southeast Asia, Oceania) was awarded via place at the World Games rather than a separate qualification event.

Withdrawals resulted in three places being reallocated to composite teams.

Competition format

The competition format has changed from prior Games. There are now only 3 team members instead of 4, with no dropped score. The two rounds of the competition are the Grand Prix and the Grand Prix Special.

 Grand Prix: All 15 teams compete in the Grand Prix. The top 8 teams, based on the aggregate score of the team's 3 riders, advance to the final round. The Grand Prix is also the qualifying round for the individual event.
 Grand Prix Special: The 8 teams competing receive a final rank based only on the Grand Prix Special score, again the aggregate score of the 3 riders (the Grand Prix scores do not carry over). Grand Prix Special routines may be set to music.

Schedule

The event takes place on three competition days over four days, with two days for the Grand Prix followed by a rest day and then the Grand Prix Special.

All times are Japan Standard Time (UTC+9).

Results

Grand Prix

Grand Prix Special

References

Team dressage